The KTM X-Bow (pronounced crossbow) is an ultra-light sports car manufactured by Austrian automotive manufacturer KTM. A company known for their production of motorcycles, the X-Bow was the first mass-produced car in their product range and was unveiled at the Geneva Motor Show in 2008. The X-Bow road car was developed in collaboration with KISKA, Audi, and Dallara.

Specifications 
KTM developed its X-Bow road cars in collaboration with design studio KISKA, Audi, and Dallara. It uses a carbon fibre monocoque. 

Two transmission options were available for the X-Bow; a 6-speed manual or a 6-speed Holinger twin-clutch DSG sequential manual. The front tyres are 205/45 ZR17 and the rear tyres are 235/40 ZR18. The X-Bow features Brembo brakes with  diameter discs at the front and  diameter discs at the rear. The X-Bow was capable of accelerating from 0-62 mph (100 km/h) in 3.9 seconds. Its top speed is 217 km/h (134.9 mph). For the GTX, GT2 Concept, and GT-XR models, the X-Bow uses a 2.5-litre Audi TFSI 20-valve I5 engine sourced from the Audi RS3.

Originally, KTM planned a production of 500 units per year; however, the company increased production to 1,000 cars a year and built a new plant near Graz due to high demand.

Models 
The first iteration of the KTM X-Bow was unveiled at the 2008 Geneva Motor Show. There have since been a number of models made available since the X-Bow's release.

X-Bow R 
The X-Bow R is an updated version of the original X-Bow. The X-Bow R was later made available for the United States market in 2019, and it was released as the KTM X-Bow Comp R. However, unlike the standard X-Bow, the Comp R is not street-legal and is exclusively a track-only car.

X-Bow RR 
The X-Bow RR is a high-performance version of the X-Bow.

X-Bow GT 

The X-Bow GT is a slightly more refined version of the X-Bow. The car contains a windscreen and side windows for the driver and passenger. The car has the same power output as the standard model and uses a 6-speed manual. The weight is slightly heavier at  due to the addition of the windscreen and windows, resulting in a slightly slower  time of 4.1 seconds, as well as a different weight distribution ratio of 38:62. The ride height is 10 mm higher. The car's aerodynamics have also been decreased. The X-Bow GT provides luggage with 50 litres of capacity, and its center console has been changed to accommodate climate control, windscreen wiper adjustment, and a windscreen washer and heating system.

X-Bow GTX 
The X-Bow GTX is a longer wheelbase track-only race car version released in 2020, manufactured in collaboration with Reiter Engineering. Aesthetically, the design is very different to the standard X-Bow. The car uses a different engine to the standard X-Bow, making use of a 2.5-litre Audi TFSI 20-valve I5 engine sourced from the Audi RS3. The 6-speed Holinger sequential transmission and carbon fibre monocoque are retained. The inline-5 engine receives a number of upgrades for racing, including upgrades to the engine management system, injection valves, waste gate, intake, and exhaust. The fuse box comes from Reiter's subsidiary company Sareni United. It also comes with fully electric power steering.

X-Bow GT-XR 
The X-Bow GT-XR is a long wheelbase model of the X-Bow based on the GTX and GT2 Concept track-only race cars, built in a collaborative effort with Reiter Engineering. The GT-XR also contains a 95-litre fuel tank. It costs €284,900.

Motorsport 
The KTM X-Bow has been the selected car for use in the Race of Champions all-star event since 2008.

The KTM X-Bow Battle race series started in 2010 and was a support event for the DTM German Touring Car series at Adria Raceway in 2010 and Lausitzring in 2011.

Marcus Clutton and Phil Keen won the Supersports category with a modified X-Bow in the 2009 British GT Championship.

SRO GT4 

A modified KTM X-Bow was raced in the Supersport category of the 2008 FIA GT4 Championship. Catharina Felser, Christopher Haase, and Dennis Retera took a podium finish at Monza, and pole position in the wet qualifying session at Nogaro. Peter Belshaw and Marcus Clutton were the GT4 champions in the 2011 season of the British GT Championship in a modified X-Bow.

KTM teased a factory GT4 version of the X-Bow in 2014, which they would later unveil in 2015. The X-Bow GT4 was built in collaboration with Reiter Engineering and KISKA. The vehicle features a closed cockpit design to comply with class regulations. It also maintains the 2.0-litre turbocharged Audi inline-4 engine and the 6-speed Holinger sequential transmission, but both are modified for racing. To accommodate the rules and regulations, the wheelbase is extended by 17 cm. The X-Bow GT4 debuted in the 2015 GT4 European Series and took its first win in its debut at the Circuit Zandvoort round. It also powered Brett Sandberg to the 2016 Pirelli World Challenge GTS Championship with multiple wins. An upgrade was introduced in 2018 with improvements in durability and performance.

An evolution model for the X-Bow GT4 was released in 2019 as the X-Bow GT4 Evo. The update was directed towards increasing the car's straight-line speed while maintaining the cornering capabilities of the previous X-Bow GT4. It also received a power increase, now producing  under balance of performance.

SRO GT2 

A SRO GT2 specification race car of the X-Bow was released alongside the GTX model in 2020, which would be unveiled as the X-Bow GT2 Concept. The GT2 Concept is based on the GTX, but is more powerful than its road-going counterpart. It debuted in the 2022 Fanatec GT2 European Series.

Reception
In a March 2012 episode of Top Gear, presenter Jeremy Clarkson drove a X-Bow GT around Donington Park circuit in England. He applauded the tyres' grip, saying during a James May-inspired session of doughnuts, "it's like driving on superglue", but both May and Clarkson criticised the complicated procedure needed to start the engine, calling it "idiotic".

In video games
The X-Bow R model appeared in Real Racing 3, Forza Motorsport 7, Assetto Corsa, The Crew 2, Gran Turismo Sport and Project CARS 2. The X-Bow GT4 appears in Asphalt 8: Airborne, Project CARS 2, Forza Horizon 4, and Assetto Corsa.

Awards and recognition
The X-Bow won the Sports Car of the Year award from British motoring show Top Gear in 2008.

See also
 Polaris Slingshot
 Ariel Atom

References

Notes

Further reading

External links

 KTM X-Bow official website
 KTM X-Bow R Exterior and Interior in 3D 4K UHD

KTM vehicles
First car made by manufacturer
2010s cars
Cars introduced in 2008
Rear mid-engine, rear-wheel-drive vehicles